Germany competed at the 2022 World Games held in Birmingham, United States from 7 to 17 July 2022. Athletes representing Germany won 24 gold medals, 7 silver medals and 16 bronze medals. The country finished in 1st place in the medal table.

Medalists

Invitational sports

Competitors
The following is the list of number of competitors in the Games.

Acrobatic gymnastics

Germany won one silver medal in acrobatic gymnastics.

Air sports

Germany competed in air sports and drone racing.

Archery

Germany won two medals in archery.

Artistic roller skating

Germany won one bronze medal in artistic roller skating.

Beach handball

Germany won one gold medal in beach handball.

Boules sports 

Germany competed in boules sports.

Bowling

Germany competed in bowling.

Canoe marathon

Germany won one medal in canoe marathon.

Canoe polo

Germany won two medals in canoe polo.

Cue sports

Germany won one gold medal in cue sports.

Dancesport

Germany won two medals in dancesport.

Duathlon

Germany competed in duathlon.

Finswimming

Germany won five medals in finswimming.

Fistball

Germany won the gold medal in both the men's and women's fistball tournaments.

Flag football

Germany competed in flag football.

Flying disc

Germany competed in the flying disc competition.

Ju-jitsu

Germany won seven medals in ju-jitsu.

Karate

Germany competed in karate.

Kickboxing

Germany competed in kickboxing.

Korfball

Germany competed in korfball.

Lacrosse

Germany competed in lacrosse.

Lifesaving

Germany won 14 medals in lifesaving.

Muaythai

Germany competed in muaythai.

Orienteering

Germany competed in orienteering.

Road speed skating

Germany won one bronze medal in road speed skating.

Sport climbing

Germany won one bronze medal in sport climbing.

Squash

Germany competed in squash.

Track speed skating

Germany won two medals in track speed skating.

Trampoline gymnastics

Germany won one silver medal in trampoline gymnastics.

Tug of war

Germany won one silver medal in tug of war.

Water skiing

Germany won one bronze medals in water skiing.

Wheelchair rugby

Germany won the bronze medal in the wheelchair rugby tournament.

References

Nations at the 2022 World Games
2022
World Games